Pogled is a village in the municipality of Arilje, Serbia. According to the 2011 census, the village has a population of 659 inhabitants.

Population

References

External links

Populated places in Zlatibor District